The 2022 Saudi Cup was a horse race that took place at King Abdulaziz Racetrack in Riyadh on 26 February 2022. It was the third running of the race, and the first after it was promoted to Group 1 status. The total prize money for the race was $20 million, with the winner receiving $10 million, making it the world's most valuable horse race at the time of running.

The race was won by outsider Emblem Road, ridden by Panamanian jockey Wigberto Ramos and trained locally in Saudi Arabia by Mitab Almulawah.

Race

Entries

A maximum field of 14 runners was declared for the race, including 2021 Saudi Cup winner Mishriff. Other notable entries included Kentucky Derby winner Mandaloun, Champions Cup winner T O Keynes, Woodward Stakes winner Art Collector, Breeders' Cup Distaff winner Marche Lorraine, and Champion Stakes winner Sealiway.

Result

References

External links

Saudi Cup

Saudi Cup
Saudi Cup
Saudi Cup
Saudi Cup